"Sing Hallelujah" is a folk song written by Mike Settle and originally recorded on the album Folk Sing Hallelujah (1961) by Mike Settle and the Settlers. It has been recorded on singles by Jeannie Hoffman 1964, The Upper U. District Singers 1964, Liverpool's The Remo Four 1967, and Germany's The Lords 1966. Israeli duo Esther & Abi Ofarim recorded a rendition which reached No. 30 in Germany in 1966. In 1967, a version by Judy Collins was released as a b-side single in Italy from her album Golden Apples of the Sun (1962).

References

1961 songs
1967 singles
Songs written by Mike Settle

Esther & Abi Ofarim songs
Philips Records singles
1966 singles
Male–female vocal duets